Matt Gibbon (born 3 June 1995) is an Australian rugby union player who plays for the  in the Super Rugby competition. His position of choice is prop.

References

Super Rugby statistics

Australian rugby union players
1995 births
Living people
Place of birth missing (living people)
Melbourne Rebels players
Greater Sydney Rams players
New South Wales Country Eagles players
Melbourne Rising players
Rugby union players from New South Wales
Rugby union props
Australia international rugby union players